A pseudohallucination (from  "false, lying" + "hallucination") is an involuntary sensory experience vivid enough to be regarded as a hallucination, but which is recognised by the person experiencing it as being subjective and unreal. By contrast, a "true" hallucination is perceived as entirely real by the person experiencing it.

The term "pseudohallucination" appears to have been coined by Friedrich Wilhelm Hagen. Hagen published his 1868 book "Zur Theorie der Halluzination," to define them as "illusions or sensory errors". The term was further explored by the Russian psychiatrist Victor Kandinsky (1849–1889). In his work "On Pseudohallucinations" ( [o psevdogalliutsinatsiakh]), he described his psychotic experience defining pseudohallucinations as "subjective perceptions similar to hallucinations, with respect to its character and vividness, but that differ from those because these do not have objective reality".

The term is not widely used in the psychiatric and medical fields, as it is considered ambiguous; the term nonpsychotic hallucination is preferred. Pseudohallucinations are more likely to happen with a hallucinogenic drug. But "the current understanding of pseudohallucinations is mostly based on the work of Karl Jaspers".

A further distinction is made between pseudohallucinations and parahallucinations, the latter being a result of damage to the peripheral nervous system.

They are considered a possible symptom of conversion disorder in DSM-IV (2000). In DSM-5 (2013), this definition has been removed. Also, pseudohallucinations can occur in people with visual/hearing loss, referred to as Charles Bonnet syndrome.

See also
 Anomalous experiences
 Auditory hallucination
 Illusion
 Lucid dream
 Phosphene

References

Bibliography
 В. Х. Кандинский. О псевдогаллюцинациях (1890) (Victor Kandinsky On Pseudohallucinations) 

Hallucinations